Microbe & Gasoline is a 2015 French comedy film written and directed by Michel Gondry. The film follows the adventures of two teenagers who take a road trip in their self-assembled vehicle. The film stars newcomers Théophile Baquet and Ange Dargent along with Audrey Tautou. It was reviewed favorably by critics.

Cast 
 Théophile Baquet as Théo Leloir / Gasoil
 Ange Dargent as Daniel Guéret / Microbe 
 Audrey Tautou as Marie-Thérèse Guéret 
 Diane Besnier as Laura 
 Vincent Lamoureux as Steve  
 Agathe Peigney as Agathe 
 Douglas Brosset as Oscar  
 Charles Raymond as Kévin   
 Ferdinand Roux-Balme as Simon   
 Marc Delarue as Romain 
 Ely Penh as the gang leader  
 Jana Bittnerova as Madame Leloir 
 Zimsky as Monsieur Leloir 
 Fabio Zenoni as Monsieur Guéret
 Matthias Fortune Droulers as Théo's brother
 Sacha Bourdo as the Russian teacher
 Laurent Poitrenaux as the dentist
 Étienne Charry as the organiser
 Marie Berto as Carole Raoult

Reception
Microbe & Gasoline holds a 75/100 on Metacritic and a 91% rating on Rotten Tomatoes, with the latter's critical consensus being, "Microbe and Gasoline brings Michel Gondry's distinctive gifts to bear on an oft-told tale, with thoroughly charming results."

Accolades

References

External links 
 

2015 films
2010s buddy comedy films
2010s French-language films
French comedy road movies
Films directed by Michel Gondry
2010s comedy road movies
StudioCanal films
2015 comedy films
2010s French films